BR serine/threonine kinase 1 is an enzyme that in humans is encoded by the BRSK1 gene.

References

External links

Further reading 
 
 
 
 
 
 
 
 
 
 
 

EC 2.7.1